is the third season of Ojamajo Doremi. The series was directed by Takuya Igarashi and produced by Toei Animation. It is a direct sequel to the previous series, Ojamajo Doremi Sharp and was broadcast on TV Asahi from February 4, 2001, to January 27, 2002, and lasted 50 episodes. In this series, Doremi and the girls are given the task to earn their witch apprenticeship back by making pastries for the Witch Senate. They are joined by a new witch apprentice, Momoko Asuka, who teaches them how to make the sweets, as they, in return, help her adjust to Japan after her move from New York.

Throughout the run of this series, two traffic safety videos were released as well as a 30-minute theatrical film directed by Shigeyasu Yamauchi, titled . 

The opening theme song for Motto!

Toei Animation's English website lists the TV series name as Magical Doremi 3 and the movie name as Magical DoReMi 3: The Secret of the Frog Stone.

Episode list

References

2001 Japanese television series debuts
2002 Japanese television series endings
Ojamajo Doremi series
Ojamajo Doremi episode lists